Lajos von Sipeki-von Balás (6 October 1913 – 27 July 2003) was a Hungarian modern pentathlete. He competed at the 1936 Summer Olympics.

References

External links
 

1913 births
2003 deaths
Hungarian male modern pentathletes
Olympic modern pentathletes of Hungary
Modern pentathletes at the 1936 Summer Olympics
People from Sopron
People from Kistarcsa
Sportspeople from Pest County